José Antonio Iglesias Bilbao (born 16 April 1965) is a Spanish former field hockey player who competed in the 1988 Summer Olympics and in the 1992 Summer Olympics.

Notes

References

External links 
 
 
 
 

1965 births
Living people
Spanish male field hockey players
Olympic field hockey players of Spain
Field hockey players at the 1988 Summer Olympics
Field hockey players at the 1992 Summer Olympics
1990 Men's Hockey World Cup players